Arthur Machado (1 January 1909 – 20 February 1997) was a former Brazilian football player. He has played for Brazil national team at the 1938 FIFA World Cup finals.

References 

1909 births
1997 deaths
Brazilian footballers
Brazil international footballers
1938 FIFA World Cup players
Association football defenders
Sportspeople from Niterói